Richard Stahl (January 4, 1932 – June 18, 2006) was an American actor who mostly appeared in comic roles on television and in films.

Early life
Born in Detroit, he studied at the American Academy of Dramatic Arts in New York City. In the 1950s, he was appearing in Off-Broadway productions, where he met his wife to be Kathryn Ish in 1959. In the 1960s, he relocated to San Francisco and became a member of an improvisational comedy group, The Committee.

Career

Some of Stahl's best known film credits include Five Easy Pieces (1970), The Student Nurses (1970), Billy Jack (1971), Beware! The Blob (1972), Dirty Little Billy (1972), High Anxiety (1977), 9 to 5 (1980), Tin Man (1983), The Flamingo Kid (1984), Overboard (1987), L.A. Story (1991), The American President (1995) and Ghosts of Mississippi (1996).

He appeared in many TV situation comedies and in occasional dramas, including That Girl, The Partridge Family, Bonanza (2 roles), Love American Style, Columbo (3 roles), All in the Family (2 roles), Good Times, What's Happening!!, The Odd Couple (9 episodes, 9 different roles), Maude, The Rookies, Happy Days, Harry O  (4 episodes, in 2 different roles), McMillan & Wife, The Bob Newhart Show (2 roles), WKRP in Cincinnati, Soap, Benson, Barney Miller (3 roles), Laverne & Shirley (3 roles), Hill Street Blues, The Facts of Life, Family Ties, Who's the Boss?, Highway to Heaven, Newhart  (3 roles as 2 different characters), Simon & Simon, Bob & Carol & Ted & Alice, Murder, She Wrote, Night Court (2 roles), Golden Girls, Empty Nest (3 roles), and Married... with Children.

Stahl co-starred in the short-lived comedy mini-series Turnabout (1979); and between 1985 and 1989 was a regular on the sitcom It's a Living, appearing in a total of 93 episodes.

Personal life and death
Stahl died aged 74, on June 18, 2006, at the Motion Picture and Television Fund Health Center in Los Angeles, after a 10-year struggle against Parkinson's disease.

Stahl's wife, actress Kathryn Ish, died of cancer in Santa Barbara, California, on December 31, 2007.

Filmography

Televisione

Benson (Benson) - serie TV,  (Bugging the Governor)|1X16]] (1980)

Colombo (Columbo) - serie TV, episodio 3x04 (1973)

References

External links
 
 

1932 births
2006 deaths
American male film actors
American male television actors
Neurological disease deaths in California
Deaths from Parkinson's disease
Male actors from Detroit
20th-century American male actors
American Academy of Dramatic Arts alumni